Marcelino Novaes Rodrigues Fil (born July 9, 1967 in São Paulo) is a retired boxer from Brazil, who won the bronze medal in the heavyweight division at the 1999 Pan American Games, together with Jamaica's Kerron Speid. Nicknamed, Robocop, he made his professional debut in 2001.

Novaes has recently relocated to Las Vegas. He soon met Max Wynn with whom he has worked several special security assignments and is now a full-time professional body guard in Las Vegas.

External links
 

1967 births
Living people
Heavyweight boxers
Sportspeople from São Paulo
Boxers at the 1995 Pan American Games
Boxers at the 1999 Pan American Games
Brazilian male boxers
Pan American Games bronze medalists for Brazil
Pan American Games medalists in boxing
Medalists at the 1999 Pan American Games
20th-century Brazilian people
21st-century Brazilian people